Voivodeship Road 120 (abbreviated DW 120) is a route in the Polish voivodeship roads network. The route links with the border crossing with Germany in Gryfino–Mescherin at the Motaniec junction with the National Road 10. The route runs through Gryfino County and Stargard County. After the village of Gardno the route joins with the S10 Expressway junction Gryfino.

Route plan

References

120